James Francis Dinning  (born December 4, 1952) is a Canadian Progressive Conservative politician and businessman. He was a Member of the Legislative Assembly of Alberta (1986–1997), and now serves on the board of directors of a variety of Canadian companies. Dinning ran for the leadership of the Alberta Progressive Conservatives to replace Ralph Klein as Premier of Alberta. Dinning raised over 2 million dollars for his leadership bid but was ultimately defeated by leadership candidate Ed Stelmach when party members voted for Klein's replacement on December 2, 2006. In June 2010, he was selected as the 12th Chancellor of the University of Calgary. Dinning sits as an advisor to Canada's Ecofiscal Commission.

Political history
After graduating at Western Canada High School in 1970, Dinning went on to obtain his
Bachelor of Commerce honours degree from Queen's University in 1974. He also earned a Master's degree in Public Administration from Queen's in 1977.

Elected in the riding of Calgary-Shaw in 1986, Dinning held the riding until 1993. During this time he served in a variety of positions within the provincial government. He was the Minister of Community and Occupational Health from 1986 to 1988, the Minister of Education from 1988 to 1992, and he served as the Provincial Treasurer from 1992 to 1997.

In 2006, Dinning ran for leadership of the Progressive Conservative Association of Alberta party. Dinning ultimately lost the party election to Ed Stelmach as a result of a second ballot vote on December 2, 2006. During much of the campaign, he held at least a 20-point lead over his closest competitor and over a 40-point lead on Stelmach.

Today he serves as a corporate director, advisor and consultant to various companies, not-for-profits and governments.

Electoral record

1986
Calgary-Shaw
Jim Dinning (PC) 6,694 61.5%
Brendan Dunphy (Lib) 2,727 25.1%
Len Curie (NDP) 1,166 10.7%
Byron L. Chenger (Rep) 295 2.7%

1989
Calgary-Shaw
Jim Dinning (PC) 7,412 52.9% (-8.6%)
Bob Crump (Lib) 4,865 34.7% (+9.7%)
Gordon M. Christie (NDP) 1,728 12.3% (+1.6%)

1993
Calgary-Lougheed (compared to Calgary-Shaw, which covered much of the same area in southwest Calgary)
Jim Dinning (PC) 7,280 52.8% (-0.2%)
Jack Driscoll (Lib) 5,803 42.1% (+7.3%)
Catherine Rose (NDP) 502 3.6% (-8.7%)
Peter Hope (CoR) 122 0.9% (-)
Ida Bugmann (NLP) 88 0.6% (-)

Career history
After retiring from active politics in 1997, he was a senior vice-president and then executive vice-president of TransAlta Corporation from August 1997 to December 2004.

Dinning currently serves on the board of directors of four companies that are listed on the Toronto Stock Exchange.  They are: Liquor Stores NA Ltd where he serves as Chair of the Board, Parkland Fuel Corp., Russel Metals Inc., and Oncolytics Biotech Inc.  Dinning also serves as chairman of the board of the Western Financial Group, Export Development Canada and the Canada West Foundation, and as chancellor of the University of Calgary.

Dinning was the chair of the Calgary Health Region from 1999 to 2001.  He was a governor of the Banff Centre, and served as a director of Finning International, Shaw Communications, the Canadian Policy Research Networks (CPRN), and the Alberta Energy Research Institute.  Dinning has also served as chairman of the Canadian Clean Power Coalition, which comprised major power producers such as ATCO, Epcor, TransAlta, Luscar, SaskPower, and Nova Scotia Power.

The University of Calgary honoured Dinning in 2002 with an honorary Doctor of Laws degree. In 2011, he joined former Alberta Premier Ralph Klein when together they were honoured by the Canadian Taxpayers Federation with their Tax Fighter Award.

He was named a Member of the Order of Canada in 2015.

References

External links
University of Calgary Senate website 
Executive profile (2003) - by Pacific Northwest Economic Region
"Jim Dinning to Receive 2005 CNIB Vision Award" (April 21, 2005) - by Canadian National Institute for the Blind

1952 births
Living people
Businesspeople from Calgary
Businesspeople from Edmonton
Canadian Anglicans
Finance ministers of Alberta
Members of the Executive Council of Alberta
Members of the Order of Canada
Politicians from Calgary
Politicians from Edmonton
Progressive Conservative Association of Alberta MLAs
Queen's University at Kingston alumni
People educated at Western Canada High School
20th-century Canadian politicians